Diego Pontac, later in life Diego de Pontac  (Loarre, 1603 - Madrid, 1654) was a Spanish composer. He began his career as a pupil at Saragossa Cathedral, and ended his career at the Court of Madrid as teniente de maestro (deputy master) of the Royal Chapel of Philip IV of Spain.

References

1603 births
1654 deaths
17th-century classical composers